is a Japanese footballer currently playing as a defender for FC Gifu on loan from Mito HollyHock in the J3 League. He is the older brother of fellow professional footballer KennedyEgbus Mikuni.

Career statistics

Club
.

Notes

References

External links

1998 births
Living people
Japanese footballers
Japan youth international footballers
Association football defenders
Juntendo University alumni
J2 League players
Mito HollyHock players